The Devil's Table ( or Salzwooger Teufelstisch) of Salzwoog, in the municipality of Lemberg, is a striking mushroom rock in the German part of the Wasgau that covers the southern part of the Palatinate Forest in the state of Rhineland-Palatinate. The rock formation lies 5 km southwest of the largest and far better known Devil's Table of Hinterweidenthal, which also has a more impressive "table shape".

Geography 
To the north are the water meadows of the  Salzbach stream, which flows from west to east here and is a right-hand tributary of the Wieslauter. Also to the north is the state road, the Landesstraße 486, which runs from Lemberg via Salzwoog to Hinterweidenthal. The Salzwoog Devil's Table is accessible from the valley of Salzwoog on a narrow footpath which branches off the trail to Dahn and climbs through a height of about 80 metres. Above the rock is a rest area which offer a panoramic view over the Salzbach water meadows.

Geology 
Like its "larger brother" at Hinterweidenthal, the Devil's Table of Salzwoog is a bunter sandstone rock formation which resembles a pedestal table. As a result or erosion the surrounding softer surface material was carried away, whilst the hard rock core remained standing. This has left an oversized "table top" perched diagonally over an equally massive "pedestal". In the Dahner Felsenland, as the region to the east is called, these types of unusually shaped rocks are very common.

Tourism 
The rock is the destination of a circular walk in the Palatinate Hiking Portal (Wanderportals Pfalz).

References 

Rock formations of Rhineland-Palatinate
Geography of the Palatinate (region)